Ch!pz is a Dutch pop music group that originated in Amsterdam, Netherlands. The group was formed in 2003, after several rounds of tryouts for Fox Kids.

Career 
In the Netherlands, many radio stations wouldn't play the Ch!pz' songs because most of the listeners found their songs too childish. However, thanks to promotions on Fox Kids, Ch!pz became one of the most well-known bands in the Netherlands. Within a year and a half, the band had three singles at the top of the Dutch singles charts. Most of their singles went straight to the number one position, except Captain Hook and their debut single Ch!pz in Black. Their debut album, The Adventures of Ch!pz, was released in 2004 in the Netherlands, which went straight to number one in the Dutch albums chart. In 2005, their second album, The World of Ch!pz, was released. Singles from it include 1001 Arabian Nights, One, Two, Three!, and Carnival. All of which peaked at the number one position.

At the start of 2005, "Ch!pz in Black", the first single from Ch!pz, was released in Germany and climbed to the second position on the German charts. Shortly thereafter, in early-May 2005, their second single, Cowboy, made it to the second position as well. A week later, the song made it all the way to the first position.

Their videos are all of the same style: The members of the band are in outlandish surroundings, and they all wear similar styles of clothing (for example, in "Ch!pz in Black", they all wear black outfits). As such, they overcome a horse thief in "Cowboy", aliens who kidnapped their fellow campers in "Ch!pz in Black", a magic lamp thief in "1001 Arabian Nights", and in "One, Two, Three!" they fight against their evil selves. All of this happens amidst clips of highly stylised dance moves, which inevitably defeat their enemies.

In April 2006, they released a new single in the Netherlands, Gangstertown. Two months after the release of the single, that peaked at number five in the Dutch Top 40, an EP was also released, Past:Present:Future (Part 1). Also, a music video was shot for Waikiki Beach, but was not released on the single. In late September, their latest single, One Day When I Grow Up was released. The single entered the Dutch charts at number 29 and climbed up to peak at number seven. A second EP, Past:Present:Future (Part 2), was released in November 2006.

"Cowboy" was released in the United Kingdom on 12 February 2007, while Ch!pz in Black was slated for a 26 March release.

In December 2007, they released a new song, Make a Big Splash, entering at number three. After that, they made a TV programme titled Chipz Dance Xperienz, in which they showed their choreographies. After that, to support the programme, in September 2008, they released CDX (Chipz Dance Xperienz), their new album, preceded by the single Dance Xperienz.

Ch!pz continued to tour during 2009 and 2010, their final concert was on 27 November 2010. During this time, there were plans for a new album, The New Adventures of Ch!pz, and a new single was in the works. But the management didn't think a new 'Ch!pz' album would be successful, so future releases were cancelled.

The band members tried to legally acquire rights to the "Ch!pz" name but were unsuccessful. They then disbanded on 1 January 2011, with the official announcement following on 3 January 2011.

Comeback 
On 23 October 2018, the group reunited with the same members as before. They said they wanted to make a comeback in the music industry after an April fools joke that was well received by many fans.

Worldwide viral 
In November 2022, Ch!pz went worldwide viral on TikTok with the song 1001 Arabian Nights. The song originally released in 2004 appeared in several videos on TikTok in October 2022 in which people performed a new dance to the song, in response to this, the pop group posted a video on November 19, 2022 on their account in which they performed the old and new dance to the song. They then went worldwide viral; their video was viewed more than 15 million times in nine days, and more than 2.6 million new videos with their song were posted on the platform in eleven days. This brought a revival of the song and it reached the top spot on the Viral charts on Spotify in Australia, Austria, Singapore, Sweden, Denmark, Finland and Poland.

Members 
Rach-L (Rachel van Hoogen) - born 27 November 1983
C!lla (Cilla Niekoop) - born 11 December 1985
P3ter (Peter Rost) - born 19 April 1984
Kev!n (Kevin Hellenbrand) - born 14 February 1985

Discography

Albums

Studio albums

Compilation albums

Singles

As lead artist

 Kung Fu Beat (2004)
 Moviestar (2004)

Other appearances

Notes

References

External links 
Ch!pz' Official Website 
Ch!pz at Bubblegum Dancer

dutch 
Dutch Eurodance groups